Marcel Marcilloux (born 3 October 1980) is a retired French foil fencer, team World champion in 2006 and 2007. He took part in the men's team foil event of the 2012 Summer Olympics. France were defeated in the quarter-finals by the United States and finished 8th.

External links

 Profile at the European Fencing Confederation

French male foil fencers
1980 births
Living people
Olympic fencers of France
Fencers at the 2012 Summer Olympics
Sportspeople from Aix-en-Provence